Killester Donnycarney Football Club is an Irish association football (soccer) club based in Killester, Dublin. Their senior men's team currently plays in the Senior Sunday Division of the Leinster Senior League.

History

The club was founded in 2018 by the merger of Killester United and Donnycarney F.C.. Killester Donnycarney were runners-up in the FAI Intermediate Cup in 2019–20, losing to St. Mochta's in the final. They have qualified for the FAI Cup on several occasions, reaching the last sixteen in 2021.

Ground

The club grounds are Hadden Park, located in Killester.

Honours
FAI Intermediate Cup
Runners-up (1): 2019–20
FAI Cup
Last sixteen (1): 2021

References

External links
 Official page

Killester
Association football clubs in Dublin (city)
2018 establishments in Ireland
Association football clubs established in 2018
Leinster Senior League (association football) clubs